Wanlip Meadows is a   nature reserve south of Wanlip and north of  Leicester. It is owned and managed by the Leicestershire and Rutland Wildlife Trust.

These meadows, which are sometimes flooded by the River Soar, are grazed by cattle. There are many birds, including the uncommon Temminck's stint and wood sandpiper. Invertebrates include grass snakes, frogs and toads.

There is access from a footpath along the west side of the River Soar.

References

Leicestershire and Rutland Wildlife Trust